Hi Honey may refer to:

Hi! Honey (TV series), 2004 Taiwanese TV series
Hi Honey, 2011 short film with Marco Grazzini
Hi Honey (album), 2015 album by Low Cut Connie